Gerhard Mena Dombaxi (born 20 October 1996) is a German professional footballer who plays as a midfielder for Austrian side SK Vorwärts Steyr.

Career statistics

References

1996 births
Living people
German footballers
Association football midfielders
2. Liga (Austria) players
FC Blau-Weiß Linz players
SK Vorwärts Steyr players
German expatriate footballers
German expatriate sportspeople in Austria
Expatriate footballers in Austria